Robert Baird (born 29 November 1942) is a former Australian cyclist. He competed in the team pursuit at the 1964 Summer Olympics. 

He is the uncle of Stuart O'Grady, the Australian cyclist who won a gold medal in the men's madison at the 2004 Summer Olympics.

References

1942 births
Living people
Australian male cyclists
Olympic cyclists of Australia
Place of birth missing (living people)
Cyclists at the 1964 Summer Olympics
Australian track cyclists